B. "Rosey" McCauley is an American former Negro league pitcher who played in the 1930s.

McCauley played for the Nashville Elite Giants in 1930. In 13 recorded games, he posted 7.83 ERA over 46 innings.

References

External links
 and Seamheads

Year of birth missing
Place of birth missing
Nashville Elite Giants players
Baseball pitchers